The Cestui que vie Act 1540 (32 Hen 8 c 37) was an Act of the Parliament of England.

Sections 1 to 3 were repealed by section 56 of, and Part I of Schedule 2 to, the Administration of Estates Act 1925.

The words from "and the avowry" to the end of the Act were repealed by section 1 of, and Schedule 1 to, the Statute Law Revision Act 1948.

The whole Act, so far as unrepealed, was repealed by section 1 of, and Part III of the Schedule to, the Statute Law (Repeals) Act 1969.

Section 4
The word "And" where first occurring in this section was repealed by section 1 of, and Schedule 1 to, the Statute Law Revision Act 1948.

References
Halsbury's Statutes,

Acts of the Parliament of England (1485–1603)
1540 in law
1540 in England